Lan Bale and John-Laffnie de Jager were the defending champions, but did not participate together this year.  Bale partnered Wayne Black, losing in the semifinals.  de Jager partnered Christo van Rensburg, losing in the first round.

Jim Grabb and Jared Palmer won the title, defeating Kent Kinnear and David Wheaton 6–4, 7–5 in the final.

Seeds

  Jim Grabb /  Jared Palmer (champions)
  Hendrik Jan Davids /  Piet Norval (quarterfinals)
  Kent Kinnear /  David Wheaton (final)
  Rodolphe Gilbert /  Nuno Marques (first round)

Draw

Draw

External links
Draw

Tel Aviv Open
1995 ATP Tour